Satguru, or sadguru, means the 'true guru' in Sanskrit. The term is distinguished from other forms of gurus, such as musical instructors, scriptural teachers, parents, and so on. A satguru has some special characteristics that are not found in any other types of spiritual guru. Satguru is a title given specifically only to an enlightened rishi or sant whose life's purpose is to guide the initiated shishya on the spiritual path, the summation of which is the realization of the Self through realization of God.

Hinduism 
According to Sivaya Subramuniyaswami, a Hindu satguru is always a sannyasin, an unmarried renunciate, but not all writers include this stricture. Tukaram, a Hindu satguru, is known to have had a family. Satguru Kabir had a son, Kamal, who was very devout.

The words sant and satguru were prominently used in the spiritual ideology of Kabir in the 15th century. Kabir says "satpurush ko jansi, Tiska satguru naam", meaning the one who has seen the supreme lord of truth (satya purush) is satguru. Kabir wrote "Devi dewal jagat mein, kotik poojey koye. Satguru ki pooja kiye, sabb ki pooja hoye", meaning that worship of satguru includes in it worship of all deities. In other words, satguru is the physical form of God (sat purusha).

In one of Kabir's songs the satguru is described as the real sadhu:

Vasishtha, Rama's guru, was the satguru in the Treta Yuga. Swami Shankar Purushottam Tirtha quoted the Yoga Vasistha regarding the "real preceptor" (satguru):

In Sant Mat and Advait Mat, the living satguru is considered the path to God-realization.

Sikhism 
In Sikh philosophy, Nanak, defines satguru as truth itself and not a physical entity. This truth emanates from reality and requires no blind faith. In the Japji Sahib he writes "Ek onkar, satguru prasad", which means "there is one creator, this knowledge I have learnt from reality". The Sikh (student) learns from reality as presented by the creator. Truth (sat) itself is the teacher (guru).

The recommendation says that the first and the foremost qualification of the satguru is that he must have known the True Lord (God) himself.

Syncretic traditions 
Meher Baba equated worship of the satguru with worship of God:

According to Dada Bhagwan, a satguru must maintain self-knowledge:

Satsang 
A satsang is an audience with a satguru for religious instruction. The name satsang is a Sanskrit word that means "gathering together for the truth" or, more simply, "being with the truth". Truth is what is real, what exists.

See also 
 List of Hindu gurus and sants

References

Works cited 

 
  
 
 
 
 
 
 

Hindu philosophical concepts
Indian philosophy